Beauty...As Far as the Eye Can See is an album by Terl Bryant. Released in 1997.

This is an album from ex-Iona drummer Terl Bryant.

Band
 Terl Bryant - drums, percussion
 Juliet Bryant - vocals
 Charlie Groves - vocals
 Dave Bainbridge - guitar, keyboards, hammond
 Troy Donockley - whistles, uilleann pipes
 Mike Haughton - saxophone

Track listing
"Blow Spirit Blow"  
"Keep Me Safe"  
"In The Shadow Of Great Wings"  
"Though I Walk"  
"Barefoot In The Grass/the Old Pipe On The Hob"  
"Beauty"  
"A Dangerous Sea"  
"Angel"  
"River Of Tears"  
"Where Do You Go?"  
"Vision Of Hope"  
"Ten Drummers Drumming"

Release details
1997, UK, ICC Records ICC21730, CD

1997 albums
Terl Bryant albums